Moston is a suburb of Manchester, in North West England, approximately  north-east of the city centre.

History
The name Moston may derive from the Old English words moss and ton, where moss usually referred to a place that was mossy, marshy or peat bog, and ton signified a town or settlement. The area of White Moss still retains these characteristics.

Historical records of Moston date back as far as 1301. The earliest historical archives are of a charter from the Lord of the Manor of Manchester, Thomas Grelle.

Although in 1320 Moston was called a hamlet of Manchester, in some deeds it is spoken of as lying within the township and parish of Ashton-under-Lyne. That the lords of Ashton had in early times rights in Moston also is shown by a fine of 1195, from which it appears that on a division Robert son of Bernard had Moston.

By the 14th century, Moston consisted of untamed countryside and agricultural settlements. In the 16th century the area saw the introduction of the linen treatment industry, with the washing and bleaching of the fabric boosting the economy throughout the area. Moston went on to become an integral part of the northern sector of 'Cottonopolis' during the 18th and 19th centuries.

The Moston Mill Print Works, which was on the junction of Williams Road and St Mary's Road, closed in 1848. Spring Valley Dye Works was sited in the area to the west to what is currently known as Lancaster Club. Extracting sand and clay from the local pits was another important industry alongside the brick works in Newton Heath. The area around Belgrave Road is known to local residents as the "White Stuff" or the "White Hills", in reference to the brickworks' waste that formed steep and unstable hills alongside the brook. These hills were reprofiled during landscaping works carried out in the early 1980s.

Increased population levels in the area resulted in the need for an increased number of residential developments.

Governance

Moston was incorporated into the city of Manchester in 1890, along with neighbouring Blackley and ceased to be a township in 1896, when it became part of the new township of North Manchester.

The town is incorporated into the parliamentary constituency of Manchester Central. This seat is currently held by Lucy Powell MP of the Labour Party and is considered a politically safe seat, having been continuously held by the party since it was created in 1974.

Following boundary changes in 2018 part of the Moston electoral ward is within the Blackley and Broughton parliamentary constituency, represented by Graham Stringer MP of the Labour Party.

Councillors

Moston is represented on Manchester City Council by three Labour councillors; Yasmine Dar (Lab), Paula Appleby (Lab), and Julie Connolly (Lab).

 indicates seat up for re-election.
 indicates councillor resigned party whip or suspended.
 indicates seat won in by-election.

Geography
 

Moston is bordered  by Harpurhey, to the east by Failsworth and by Newton Heath and Monsall to the south.

The town is built on a mixture of Bunter sandstone and Manchester marl (clay) that is Permo-Triassic in origin. The area is underlain with middle coal measures (mainly Carboniferous Westphalian B).

During the search for mineral deposits, geologists discovered a geological fault (known as the Moston Fault) running between Clayton Bridge and Alkrington.

Moston Brook flows through the district, forming the border with Failsworth and Newton Heath.

Landmarks

Broadhurst Park was opened in 1920 and provides a range of activity opportunities and community events, including football. The park provides green space within the Irk Valley corridor. Broadhurst Park and Field stage summer funfairs and summer sports activities for children. The majority of the site is open grassland, and includes a landscaped area. The north of the park is home to recreation and community events, while the south contains woodland.

Recent drainage improvements to the football fields have greatly increased the biodiversity significance of the neighbouring Broadhurst Clough area, where the open water is home to a wide range of wildlife.

Nuthurst Park is a community park on Nuthurst Road, containing a children's playground, 5-a-side pitch, tennis court and basketball courts.

Hough Hall, on Hough Hall Road, is the oldest building in the Moston area. The Hall was listed as a Grade II listed building on 3 October 1974 and was erected in approximately the 16th–17th centuries.

Transport

Moston railway station is located off Hollinwood Avenue, in New Moston, and is unstaffed. Since the closure of the Oldham Loop Line in 2009, all trains calling at the station are on the Caldervale route managed by Northern. The area is also served by Newton Heath and Moston Metrolink station, part of the Manchester Metrolink light rail service.

Moston is served by several bus services, primarily along Moston Lane directly to and from Manchester city centre. Bus routes that go to Manchester city centre include 51, 81, 88, 112, 118, 77, 24, 182, 114, 81A 149 and 188. Bus routes from Moston also go to Middleton, Pendleton, Failsworth, Oldham, Cheetham Hill and Chadderton. The bus routes are managed by Transport for Greater Manchester (TfGM) and the Bluebird Bus and Coach company.

The road links in the area allow for easy transit to all of the surrounding districts and cities; the main thoroughfares are Broadway, which is technically part of New Moston, Lightbowne Road and Victoria Avenue. The M60 is an orbital motorway surrounding the majority of Greater Manchester; access can be gained onto it via junction 21 on Broadway.

Education 

The Manchester College (previously known as MANCAT (Manchester College of Arts and Technology) has a campus in Moston, which used to be known as Moston Technical College, and at One Central Park. These campuses offer further education facility for school leavers and adults. The One Central Park Campus offers courses run by Manchester NTI (New Technology Institute) in partnership with Manchester College, specialising in IT and Management and Enterprise skills.

Religious sites

The oldest church still in use is Streetfold Methodist Church, which was founded in 1825. In 1907 the United Methodist Free Church merged with the Methodist New Connexion and the Bible Christians to form the United Methodist Church. In 1932, there was a further union in Britain (the 1932 Methodist Union), in which Primitive Methodists, Wesleyan Methodists and United Methodists came together as the Methodist Church.

Roman Catholic churches in Moston fall under the control of the Roman Catholic Diocese of Salford whilst the Anglican churches, the Anglican Diocese of Manchester. Statistics state that Moston is not as religiously diverse as some other areas of Manchester.

St Joseph's Cemetery (commonly known as Moston Cemetery) which opened in 1875, stretches out over a wide sloping site and is one of Manchester's principal Roman Catholic cemeteries. It contains the war graves of 214 Commonwealth service personnel from World War I and 144 from World War II; those whose graves have no headstones are listed on a Screen Wall memorial which also list 11 Belgian soldiers who were later exhumed and reburied in Belgium.

The Alexian Brothers Care Centre is a dual registered care home providing long-term care for older people requiring residential support and nursing care. The current building was completed in 1992 to replace the original hospital of the Alexian Brothers. The home is set within mature gardens in a secure, gated development.

The Alexian Brothers is a religious institute, originating in Belgium in the 14th century and has been closely involved with care of the elderly in the local community since first settling in Manchester in 1875. This work has continued on the same site in Moston since 1884. The Hospital Management Trust assumed responsibility for the operational management of the Care Centre in January 2006 in response to the Brothers need to step back from front line management.

Sport

Broadhurst Park football stadium, built in 2015, is the home of F.C. United of Manchester; it is the area's non-League football club, which plays in the Northern Premier League Premier Division.

Broadway Leisure Centre has a 25m swimming pool, a fitness suite, workout studio, sun beds and sauna and steam rooms.

North Manchester Rugby Union Club are based at Tudor Lodge, Victoria Avenue East; the first team participate in the North Lancashire Division 1 league.

Moston Brook AFC is an amateur football club, which was formed in 1969 as an 'Old Boys' team to be made up of former pupils from Moston Brook High School, although the school was closed August 2000.

Moston Valley FC was established in 2002 and became an FA Charter Standard Club in 2005. The teams range from under 8s up to under 16s; all play in a variety of leagues around Manchester.

Broadhurst Bowling Club is located in Broadhurst Park and  stages a summer charity competition annually of four or five bowling handicaps; this is in aid of Francis House Children's Cancer Charity and the Catholic Rescue Society.

The Fitness First chain have a gym located on Victoria Avenue East with a cardio theatre, spinning room and other exercise facilities.

Public services
Policing in Moston is provided by Greater Manchester Police. A part-time station is located in Harpurhey on Moston Lane, under the command of North Manchester (A) Division.

New Moston Library is located on Nuthurst Road in New Moston, and aside from stocking books there are a vast number of other services and activities organised there. A T'ai chi club, the Moston Midwifery Group children's groups, Parent and Carer Information point, Health Information point and T'ai chi club use the site as a base.

Waste management is co-ordinated by the local authority via the North Manchester Household Waste and Recycling Centre.

Notable people
Local Moston celebrities include television historian Michael Wood, social reformer and political reformer Samuel Bamford, actress Marsha Thomason who has found fame in such US shows as Las Vegas and Lost, the noted educationist Francis Smyth and Pete Mitchell from XFM, Kavana who is a singer and actor,
rapper Aitch, Nottingham Forest and former England Under 21 footballer, Ishmael Miller, is another notable Moston citizen. The former Manchester City attacking midfielder was known on the terraces as The Moston Menace due to his formidable physique. Another footballer, Charles Broadhurst, was also born in Moston.

Major Henry Kelly VC, MC & Bar was a Moston born officer in the Duke of Wellington's (West Riding) Regiment who saw action in the First World War. Kelly received his Victoria Cross for his action on the 4 October 1916 at Le Sars, France. He was awarded his Military Cross & Bar for subsequent acts of heroism in the war. After the war, Kelly moved to Ireland and went on to become the chief of staff for overseas operations in the Free State Army.

William Chaderton was born in the district around 1540 and was an English academic and Anglican bishop. He was the Bishop of Chester from 1579 to 1595 and then Bishop of Lincoln from 1595 to 1608 from where he went on to become  Warden of Manchester College.

Liam McNally, opera singer known for his appearance on Britain's Got Talent in 2010.

Fr Brian Seale of St John Vianney's Church wrote a history of the suburb entitled The Moston Story.

Alternative/indie rock band Northside is from Moston.

See also 

Listed buildings in Manchester-M40
1808 – The Grand Orange Order of England was formed in Manchester with Colonel Samual Taylor of Moston as first Grand Master.
Murder of Suzanne Capper
Broadhurst Park (public park)

References

Areas of Manchester
Manchester City Council Wards